Richard Clarke (May 1, 1711 – February 27, 1795), Boston merchant and Loyalist, was the son of William and Hannah (Appleton) Clarke of Boston, where he was born. On May 3, 1733 he married Elizabeth Winslow, who has been variously said to be the daughter of Edmund, Isaac, and Col. Edward Winslow. It is probable that she was the Elizabeth, daughter of Edward Winslow and Elizabeth his wife, whose birth of February 16, 1712 is recorded in the Boston records. Both Richard Clarke and his wife were of distinguished ancestry and occupied a high social position. 

Richard had graduated from Harvard College in 1729 and became one of the most prominent merchants in Boston, his firm at the time of the American Revolution including his two sons, Jonathan and Isaac, under the name of Richard Clarke & Sons. Jonathan was in London in 1773 and Richard Clarke & Sons were named as factors for the Honourable East India Company and were among the consignees of the tea which was thrown into Boston Harbor in December of that year, in the Boston Tea Party. On November 2, they had received a letter signed "O. C.," ordering them to appear at the Liberty Tree the following Wednesday at noon to make a public resignation of their commission as factors. On Wednesday morning some of the other consignees, including Thomas Hutchinson Jr. (son of the governor), Benjamin Faneuil, and Joshua Winslow, met the Clarkes at their warehouse on King Street. A mob of about five hundred had gathered at the Liberty Tree and, as the merchants did not appear, a considerable number gathered in front of the warehouse. Nine of them went in as emissaries to induce the merchants to yield, and, when they refused to do so, the mob attempted to storm the building but was repulsed. When Jonathan arrived from England there was a gathering of friends at the Clarkes' house in School Street to welcome him, which led to another attack by the mob. The Clarke firm at first refused to sign the Non-Importation Agreement, but afterward consented. Richard Clarke was also one of the signers of the Address to Gen. Gage. 

The family had become extremely unpopular with the Whigs, and when, on one occasion, Isaac went to Plymouth to collect some debts, he was attacked and forced to make a midnight escape. Susannah Farnum Clarke, one of Richard's four daughters, had married the artist John Singleton Copley in 1769 and had gone to live with him in London. In view of the growing difficulties in Boston, Clarke decided to go to England also, and after a remarkable voyage of only twenty-one days landed there on December 24, 1775, and lived at Copley's house until his death. With one of his sons he joined the Loyalist Club of London. The family was on the American proscription lists, but in his will Clarke disposed of considerable property, including Bank of England stock and American securities.

Notes

References
 "Richard Clarke". Dictionary of American Biography. American Council of Learned Societies, 1928-1936.

People from colonial Boston
American Loyalists from Massachusetts
American merchants
Appleton family
Harvard College alumni
Harvard College Loyalists in the American Revolution
American businesspeople in shipping
Colonial American merchants
1711 births
1795 deaths